Night Prayers is a studio album by the Kronos Quartet. It contains commissioned pieces with music from former Soviet republics in Eastern Europe and Central Asia, and includes performances by Throat Singers of Tuva, Dawn Upshaw (soprano), Djivan Gasparyan (duduk), and Mikhail Alexandrovich (cantor).

Track listing

Personnel

Musicians
David Harrington – violin
John Sherba – violin
Hank Dutt – viola
Joan Jeanrenaud – cello
Throat Singers of Tuva (track 1)
Kaigal-ool Khovalyg
Anatoly Kuular
Kongar-ol Ondar
Dawn Upshaw – soprano (track 2)
Djivan Gasparyan – duduk (track 5)
Mikhail Alexandrovich – cantor (track 6)

Production
Recorded at Skywalker Sound, Nicasio, California; The American Academy of Arts and Letters, New York, New York; and Mechanics Hall, Worcester, Massachusetts
Judith Sherman, Kronos Quartet – Producers
Robert Hurwitz – Executive producer
Joseph Chilorio – Engineer (tracks 4, 6)
Bob Edwards – Engineer (tracks 1, 7)
Judith Sherman – Engineer (tracks 2–6)
Craig Silvey – Engineer (tracks 3–5)
Paul Zinman – Engineer (track 2)
Mark Donahue – Assistant engineer (track 4)
Chris Haynes – Assistant engineer (tracks 4, 5)
Tom Luekens – Assistant engineer (tracks 1, 3)
Craig Silvey – Assistant engineer (track 7)
David Wojnarowicz – Cover
Frank Olinsky – Design

See also
List of 1994 albums

References 

1994 classical albums
Kronos Quartet albums
Nonesuch Records albums